Gabriel Pizza is a pizza restaurant franchise located in the Canadian provinces of Ontario and Quebec. The company currently has a total of 38 locations in these provinces. Gabriel Pizza's current president and CEO is George Hanna.

History
Gabriel Pizza was founded in Orleans, Ontario Canada by Michael Hanna on February 28, 1977. Located primarily in Canada's Capital, Gabriel Pizza currently owns and franchises stores in the communities of Ottawa, Brockville, Kingston, Kanata, Stittsville, Embrun, Rockland and Kemptville. There are also 4 franchises in Quebec in the communities of Aylmer, Gatineau, Hull and Buckingham. Gabriel Pizza operates both quick service delivery locations and traditional casual restaurants.

See also
 List of Canadian pizza chains

References

Further reading

External links
 

Pizza chains of Canada
Companies based in Ottawa
Restaurants established in 1977
1977 establishments in Canada